Medar Shtylla (28 February 1907 in Korçë – 20 December 1963 in Tirana) was an Albanian politician and one of the main organizers of the Albania Liberation Movement during World War II. He served as Minister of Health from 1946 to 1955 and later as Chairman of the Assembly of the Republic of Albania from 21 June 1958 until his death on 20 December 1963.

References

Speakers of the Parliament of Albania
Members of the Parliament of Albania
Labour Party of Albania politicians
1907 births
1963 deaths
20th-century Albanian politicians
People from Korçë
People from Manastir vilayet
Government ministers of Albania
Health ministers of Albania